Dr. Lancelot Osbert "Lance" Sleeman (21 March 1885 – 20 December 1968) was an Australian rules footballer who played with Melbourne and University in the Victorian Football League (VFL).

Family
Originally from Wonthaggi,

Education
Sleeman was educated at Scotch College, but he never played school football for Scotch. After further education at Melbourne University where he studied medicine, Sleeman became a general practitioner.

Notes

References
Holmesby, Russell & Main, Jim (2007). The Encyclopedia of AFL Footballers. 7th ed. Melbourne: Bas Publishing.

External links

1885 births
1968 deaths
Australian rules footballers from Victoria (Australia)
University Football Club players
Melbourne Football Club players
People educated at Scotch College, Melbourne
Medical doctors from Melbourne
Melbourne Medical School alumni